Jane Couch,  (born 14 August 1968) is a British former professional boxer who competed from 1994 to 2007. She became the first licensed female boxer in the United Kingdom in 1998, and won numerous world titles. Couch has since become a boxing promoter.

Background
Born in Fleetwood, Lancashire, Couch was expelled from her school in Blackpool and thereafter lived "a life of booze, drugs and street fighting". At the age of 26 she saw a television documentary about women's boxing and decided to try it. In her first official fight, a Muay Thai match, she defeated a policewoman, about which she said "it was brilliant to flatten one [a police officer] and get paid for it".
She still resides in Fleetwood as of March 2022.

Professional boxing career
The British Boxing Board of Control initially refused to grant Couch a professional licence on the sole ground that she was a woman, and argued that PMS made women too unstable to box. Claiming sexual discrimination and supported by the Equal Opportunities Commission, Couch managed to have this decision overturned by a tribunal in March 1998. However, some criticism followed as the British Medical Association called this result "a demented extension of equal opportunities".

Couch would later seek the right to fight a male opponent, but was unsuccessful. Of this, she said 

Couch's first major success occurred in only her fifth pro fight in 1996 when she won the WIBF light welterweight title by outpointing France's Sandra Geiger over ten rounds in Copenhagen, Denmark. Of this fight, Couch observed in 2004 that "I have never been hit so hard in all my life", and called Geiger "the toughest opponent (she) fought".

Couch's first defence of her title was against noted female boxer Andrea DeShong, who was stopped in seven rounds in New Orleans, Louisiana in March 1997.

The first sanctioned professional boxing match between women in the U.K. was in November 1998 at Streatham in London, between Couch and Simona Lukic. Couch won.

In September 2003 Staples Center, Los Angeles, Couch lost on points over eight rounds to the highly regarded Lucia Rijker of Holland.

Her last fight, against Anne Sophie Mathis on 8 December 2007, resulted in a loss by technical knockout.

She announced her retirement on 1 December 2008 and said she intended to continue as a boxing promoter. At the time, she said 

Couch's overall professional record was 28 wins (9 KOs), 11 defeats.

Other achievements

In 2001, she published an autobiography, Jane Couch – Fleetwood Assassin.

Couch was appointed a Member of the Order of the British Empire (MBE) in the 2007 Queen's Birthday Honours.

In 2012, Couch was awarded the AOCA / Awakening Outstanding Contribution Award for her part played in raising public awareness and acceptance of female fighters.

In 2016, Couch was inducted into the Women's International Boxing Hall of Fame in Fort Lauderdale, Florida. The IWBHF was created and founded in 2014 by Sue TL Fox.

Post-boxing career
In 2008 Couch competed in the reincarnation of Superstars.

On 20 December 2008 Couch co-promoted a promotion with Ricky Hatton in Bristol and then in February 2009 announced a more formal partnership with Hatton Promotions when she signed as boxing co-ordinator.

Couch long supported the inclusion of women's boxing in the Olympic Games, saying  On 12 August 2009 it was reported that the International Olympic Committee appeared set to include the sport in the 2012 Summer Olympics.

In December 2009, Couch promoted a competition at the Marriott Hotel, Bristol.

Couch also has her own YouTube channel which features regular interviews with people involved in boxing.

Professional boxing record

| style="text-align:center;" colspan="8"|28 Wins (9 KOs), 11 Losses
|-  style="text-align:center; background:#e3e3e3;"
|  style="border-style:none none solid solid; "|Res.
|  style="border-style:none none solid solid; "|Record
|  style="border-style:none none solid solid; "|Opponent
|  style="border-style:none none solid solid; "|Type
|  style="border-style:none none solid solid; "|Round
|  style="border-style:none none solid solid; "|Date
|  style="border-style:none none solid solid; "|Location
|  style="border-style:none none solid solid; "|Notes
|- align=center
|Loss
|28–11
|align=left| Anne Sophie Mathis
|
|
|
|align=left|
|
|- align=center
|Loss
|28–10
|align=left| Jaime Clampitt
|
|
|
|align=left|
|
|- align=center
|Loss
|28–9
|align=left| Holly Holm
|
|
|
|align=left|
|
|- align=center
|Win
|28–8
|align=left| Viktoria Oliynyk
|
|
|
|align=left|
|
|- align=center
|Win
|27–8
|align=left| Galina Gumliiska
|
|
|
|align=left|
|
|- align=center
|Loss
|26–8
|align=left| Myriam Lamare
|
|
|
|align=left|
|
|- align=center
|Win
|26–7
|align=left| Oksana Cernikova
|
|
|
|align=left|
|
|- align=center
|Loss
|25–7
|align=left| Jessica Rakoczy
|
|
|
|align=left|
|
|- align=center
|Win
|25–6
|align=left| Larysa Berezenko
|
|
|
|align=left|
|
|- align=center
|Win
|24–6
|align=left| Jaime Clampitt
|
|
|
|align=left|
|
|- align=center
|Loss
|23–6
|align=left| Nathalie Toro
|
|
|
|align=left|
|
|- align=center
|Win
|23–5
|align=left| Borislava Goranova
|
|
|
|align=left|
|
|- align=center
|Win
|22–5
|align=left| Brenda Drexel
|
|
|
|align=left|
|
|- align=center
|Win
|21–5
|align=left| Brenda Drexel
|
|
|
|align=left|
|
|- align=center
|Loss
|20–5
|align=left| Lucia Rijker
|
|
|
|align=left|
|
|- align=center
|Win
|20–4
|align=left| Larysa Berezenko
|
|
|
|align=left|
|
|- align=center
|Win
|19–4
|align=left| Borislava Goranova
|
|
|
|align=left|
|
|- align=center
|Win
|18–4
|align=left| Borislava Goranova
|
|
|
|align=left|
|
|- align=center
|Win
|17–4
|align=left| Borislava Goranova
|
|
|
|align=left|
|
|- align=center
|Loss
|16–4
|align=left| Sumya Anani
|
|
|
|align=left|
|
|- align=center
|Win
|16–3
|align=left| Tzanka Karova
|
|
|
|align=left|
|
|- align=center
|Win
|15–3
|align=left| Carla Witherspoon
|
|
|
|align=left|
|
|- align=center
|Win
|14–3
|align=left| Viktoria Oliynyk
|
|
|
|align=left|
|
|- align=center
|Loss
|13–3
|align=left| Elizabeth Mueller
|
|
|
|align=left|
|
|- align=center
|Win
|13–2
|align=left| Galina Gumliiska
|
|
|
|align=left|
|
|- align=center
|Win
|12–2
|align=left| Michelle Strauss
|
|
|
|align=left|
|
|- align=center
|Win
|11–2
|align=left| Sharon Anyos
|
|
|
|align=left|
|
|- align=center
|Win
|10–2
|align=left| Heike Noller
|
|
|
|align=left|
|
|- align=center
|Win
|9–2
|align=left| Marischa Sjauw
|
|
|
|align=left|
|
|- align=center
|Win
|8–2
|align=left| Simona Lukic
|
|
|
|align=left|
|
|- align=center
|Loss
|7–2
|align=left|Dora Webber
|
|
|
|align=left|
|
|- align=center
|Loss
|7–1
|align=left|Dora Webber
|
|
|
|align=left|
|
|- align=center
|Win
|7–0
|align=left| Leah Mellinger
|
|
|
|align=left|
|
|- align=center
|Win
|6–0
|align=left| Andrea DeShong
|
|
|
|align=left|
|
|- align=center
|Win
|5–0
|align=left| Sandra Geiger
|
|
|
|align=left|
|
|- align=center
|Win
|4–0
|align=left| Julia Shirley
|
|
|
|align=left|
|
|- align=center
|Win
|3–0
|align=left| Jane Johnson
|
|
|
|align=left|
|
|- align=center
|Win
|2–0
|align=left| Fosteres Joseph
|
|
|
|align=left|
|
|- align=center
|Win
|1–0
|align=left| Kalpna Shah
|
|
|
|align=left|
|
|- align=center

See also
 List of female boxers

References

External links

Jane Couch profile at Awakening Fighters

1968 births
Living people
English women boxers
Members of the Order of the British Empire
People from Fleetwood
World boxing champions
Sportspeople from Lancashire
Lightweight boxers
Light-welterweight boxers